Roger Kenneth Spink (born December 1959) is a Falkland Islands politician who has served as a Member of the Legislative Assembly for the Stanley constituency since the 2017 general election.

Before his election, Spink served as Director and General Manager of the Falkland Islands Company from 2001 and then in 2006 he was appointed President of the Falkland Islands Chamber of Commerce, retiring from both positions in 2016.

References

1959 births
Living people
Falkland Islands businesspeople
Falkland Islands MLAs 2017–2021
Falkland Islands MLAs 2021–2025